Barry Kelly (25 January 1942 – 1 September 2008) was an Australian rules footballer who played for the North Melbourne Football Club in the Victorian Football League (VFL).

Notes

External links 

1942 births
2008 deaths
Australian rules footballers from Victoria (Australia)
North Melbourne Football Club players